Laville DI-4 was a prototype two-seat fighter aircraft developed in the Soviet Union in the 1930s. The chief designer Henri Laville was one of several French aviation specialists invited to work in the Soviet Union and not surprisingly the DI-4 layout was typical of the French trend at the time with a high-mounted gull wing (first for a Soviet aircraft) and all-metal construction. Test flight program was completed in 1933 but despite good performance the aircraft did not enter mass production, in part because Soviet Union had no plans to purchase the Curtiss V-1570 engine.

Specifications (DI-4)

References

Bibliography

1930s Soviet fighter aircraft
Aircraft first flown in 1932
Gull-wing aircraft